"Shaka Beach: Laka Laka La" (Stylized as "シャカビーチ〜Laka Laka La〜") is the 8th single by the Japanese band Uverworld and was released on August 8, 2007 in CD and CD+DVD format. The song uses Spanish guitar influences. In the promotional video, people are seen doing the mambo.

Track listing

 "Shaka Beach ~Laka Laka La~" (シャカビーチ〜Laka Laka La〜)
 "Rainy"
 "Sorrow　[file named "Moment"]"

Charts

Oricon sales chart (Japan)

2007 singles
Uverworld songs
2007 songs
Gr8! Records singles